This is a List of Norwegian jazz musicians, and a part of the List of jazz musicians and the List of Norwegian musicians notable enough for Wikipedia articles.

A 

Steinar Aadnekvam
Frøy Aagre
Andreas Amundsen
Arild Andersen
Frida Ånnevik
Tora Augestad

B 

Jon Audun Baar
Erik Balke
Jon Balke
Frode Barth
Kjell Bartholdsen
Espen Berg
Frode Berg
Andrea Rydin Berge
Totti Bergh
Kristian Bergheim
Jarle Bernhoft
Mads Berven
Ove Alexander Billington
Snorre Bjerck
Christina Bjordal
Asmund Bjørken
Terje Bjørklund
Ivar Loe Bjørnstad
Ketil Bjørnstad
Oddbjørn Blindheim
Svein Olav Blindheim
Brynjulf Blix
Øystein B. Blix
Stein Inge Brækhus
Øyvind Brække
Øyvind Brandtsegg
Ellen Brekken
Nora Brockstedt
Rune Brøndbo
Tore Brunborg
Mari Kvien Brunvoll

C 

Stian Carstensen
Emilie Stoesen Christensen
Jon Christensen
Svein Christiansen

D 

Thomas T. Dahl
Erland Dahlen
Harald Dahlstrøm
Eyolf Dale
Olav Dale
Børre Dalhaug
Laila Dalseth
Daniel Heløy Davidsen
Fredrik Luhr Dietrichson

E 

Marte Eberson
Jon Eberson
Ditlef Eckhoff
Johannes Eick
Mathias Eick
Trude Eick
Mats Eilertsen
Kenneth Ekornes
Audun Ellingsen
Torstein Ellingsen
Odd André Elveland
Sidsel Endresen
Helén Eriksen
Torun Eriksen
Simone Eriksrud
Audun Erlien

F 

Per Arne Ferner
Svein Finnerud
Trygve Waldemar Fiske
Frode Fjellheim
Mikkel Flagstad
Ingebrigt Håker Flaten
Gabriel Fliflet
Svein Folkvord
Håvard Fossum
Christer Fredriksen
Arve Furset
Svein Magnus Furu

G 

David Gald
Jan Garbarek
Kåre Garnes
Siri Gellein
Terje Gewelt
Anne-Marie Giørtz
Ole Henrik Giørtz
Jan Martin Gismervik
Siri Gjære
Frode Gjerstad
Ole Amund Gjersvik
Haakon Graf
Rolf Graf
Henning Gravrok
Rowland Greenberg
Ivar Grydeland
Jostein Gulbrandsen
Tord Gustavsen
Finn Guttormsen
Guttorm Guttormsen
Ketil Gutvik

H 

Morten Halle
Frode Haltli
Børge-Are Halvorsen
Harald Halvorsen
Atle Hammer
Ole Hamre
Anders Hana
Ole Jacob Hansen
Trond Sverre Hansen
Aslak Hartberg
Jakop Janssønn Hauan
Lars Andreas Haug
Svein Dag Hauge
Tor Haugerud
Pål Hausken
Hilde Hefte
Eirik Hegdal
Arve Henriksen
Even Helte Hermansen
Daniel Herskedal
Svein Olav Herstad
Per Hillestad
Jan Gunnar Hoff
Bendik Hofseth
Sigurd Hole
Geir Holmsen
Wetle Holte
Lars Horntveth
Line Horntveth
Martin Horntveth
Sveinung Hovensjø
Kirsti Huke
Hans Hulbækmo
Per Husby
Stig Hvalryg
Jan Kåre Hystad
Ole Jacob Hystad

I 

John Pål Inderberg
Terje Isungset
Carl Morten Iversen
Einar Iversen

J 

Torbjørn Sletta Jacobsen
Frank Jakobsen
Christian Jaksjø
Nils Jansen
Tore Jensen
Bjørn Jenssen
Erlend Jentoft
Kim Johannesen
Erik Johannessen
Bjørn Johansen
Egil Johansen
Håkon Mjåset Johansen
Nils-Olav Johansen
Per Oddvar Johansen
Roger Johansen
Tore Johansen
Vidar Johansen
Harald Johnsen
Per Jørgensen

K 

Hanne Kalleberg
Olaf Kamfjord
Maria Kannegaard
Egil Kapstad
Kenneth Kapstad
Konrad Kaspersen
Halvard Kausland
Frode Kjekstad
Bjørn Kjellemyr
Hilde Marie Kjersem
Bjørn Klakegg
Rune Klakegg
Audun Kleive
Andreas Lønmo Knudsrød
Sigurd Køhn
Per Kolstad
Ivar Kolve
Kåre Kolve
Kristoffer Kompen
Jan Erik Kongshaug
Olga Konkova
Håkon Kornstad
Tor Egil Kreken
Knut Kristiansen
Karin Krog
Anine Kruse
Benedikte Shetelig Kruse
Bjørn Kruse
Jannike Kruse
Philip Kruse
Ola Kvernberg
Frank Kvinge

L 

Geir Langslet
Morten Gunnar Larsen
Harald Lassen
Anja Lauvdal
Beate S. Lech
Helge Lien
Helge Lilletvedt
Julius Lind
Kristoffer Lo
Torstein Lofthus
Eivind Lønning
Andreas Stensland Løwe
Håvard Lund
Lage Lund
Alf Wilhelm Lundberg
Geir Lysne
Jo David Meyer Lysne

M 

Lasse Marhaug
Hans Mathisen
Jørgen Mathisen
Nils Mathisen
Ole Mathisen
Per Mathisen
Sondre Meisfjord
Fredrik Mikkelsen
Sjur Miljeteig
Andreas Mjøs
Heida Mobeck
Guro Skumsnes Moe
Yngve Moe
Bernt Moen
Øystein Moen
Nils Petter Molvær
Kjetil Møster
Kim Myhr
Jo Berger Myhre
Ole Jørn Myklebust

N 

Magnus Skavhaug Nergaard
Bjarne Nerem
Rune Nergaard
Silje Nergaard
Marius Neset
Gard Nilssen
Paal Nilssen-Love
Bodil Niska
Helge Andreas Norbakken
Robert Normann
Øystein Norvoll
Hermund Nygård
Erik Nylander
Kåre Nymark
Lena Nymark
Atle Nymo
Frode Nymo

O 

Kim Ofstad
Jørn Øien
Hildegunn Øiseth
Njål Ølnes
Tom Olstad
Stian Omenås
Kåre Opheim
Carl Petter Opsahl
Eivind Opsvik
Even Ormestad
Svein Øvergaard

P 

Hanna Paulsberg
Arvid Gram Paulsen
Eivin One Pedersen
Hallgeir Pedersen
Kim-Erik Pedersen
Hayden Powell

Q

R 

Eldbjørg Raknes
Steinar Raknes
Brynjar Rasmussen
Knut Reiersrud
Marius Reksjø
Knut Riisnæs
Odd Riisnæs
Ane Carmen Roggen
Ida Roggen
Live Maria Roggen
André Roligheten
Elin Rosseland
Marita Røstad
Espen Rud
Terje Rypdal

S 

Ernst-Wiggo Sandbakk
Tore Sandbakken
Ole Marius Sandberg
Natalie Sandtorv
Marit Sandvik
Philip Schjetlein
Karl Seglem
Gunhild Seim
Trygve Seim
Esben Selvig
Kristin Sevaldsen
Kenneth Sivertsen
David Aleksander Sjølie
Jonas Howden Sjøvaag
Reidar Skår
Even Kruse Skatrud
Heidi Skjerve
Erlend Skomsvoll
Audun Skorgen
Anja Eline Skybakmoen
Baard Slagsvold
Solveig Slettahjell
Finn Sletten
Erlend Slettevoll
Eivind Solberg
Torgrim Sollid
Gaute Storaas
Vigleik Storaas
Øyvind Storesund
Ståle Storløkken
Håkon Storm-Mathisen
Liv Stoveland
Fredrik Carl Størmer
Isak Strand
Karl Strømme
Thomas Strønen
Håvard Stubø
Kjersti Stubø
Thorgeir Stubø
Helge Sunde
Torbjørn Sunde
Christian Meaas Svendsen

T 

Hild Sofie Tafjord
Runar Tafjord
Stein Erik Tafjord
Martin Taxt
Frode Thingnæs
Hedvig Mollestad Thomassen
Kåre Thomsen
Ole Thomsen
Magne Thormodsæter
Pål Thowsen
Radka Toneff
Gisle Torvik
Heine Totland

U 

Sigurd Ulveseth
Andreas Ulvo
Stein Urheim

V 

Ole Morten Vågan
Knut Værnes
Jonas Kilmork Vemøy
Terje Venaas
Jarle Vespestad
Mathilde Grooss Viddal

W 

Carl Haakon Waadeland
Christian Wallumrød
David Wallumrød
Fredrik Wallumrød
Susanna Wallumrød
Rob Waring
Ellen Andrea Wang
Gulleiv Wee
Jens Wendelboe
Magni Wentzel
Bugge Wesseltoft
Stian Westerhus
Petter Wettre
Erling Wicklund
Håvard Wiik
Freddy Wike
Christian Skår Winther

Y

Z 

Ingar Zach
Per Zanussi

Jazz
Jazz musicians
Lists of musicians by nationality
Lists of musicians by genre